Entoloma luteum  is a mushroom in the family Entolomataceae. It was described in 1902 by mycologist Charles Horton Peck. Found in North America, it fruits singly or in clusters on the ground in mixed forest. Its angular spores are non-amyloid, hyaline (translucent), and measure 9–13 by 8–12 µm. Entoloma murrayi is a lookalike species that has a more orange cap with a pointy umbo.

See also
List of Entoloma species

References

External links

Entolomataceae
Fungi of North America
Fungi described in 1902
Taxa named by Charles Horton Peck